Emma Georgina Annalies Fielding (born 7 October 1964 in Catterick, North Riding of Yorkshire) is an English actress.

Biography
The daughter of a British Army officer, Colonel Johnny Fielding, and Sheila Fielding, she was raised Catholic and some of her childhood in Malaysia and Nigeria, and a period in Malvern. While studying at the Berkhamsted Collegiate boarding school, she won a place at Robinson College, Cambridge to study law, after spending a gap year which included five months in a kibbutz in the occupied West Bank, Palestine, picking watermelons, and as an usherette at the Oxford Apollo; before embarking on the study of acting at the Royal Scottish Academy of Music and Drama.

After graduation she worked for the Royal National Theatre and the Royal Shakespeare Company, coming to the attention of critics in 1993's National Theatre production of Tom Stoppard's Arcadia, in which she created the role of Thomasina, and then most notably in John Ford's The Broken Heart for which she won the Dame Peggy Ashcroft Award for Best Actress. Also in 1993, she was Agnes in The School for Wives at the Almeida Theatre, for which she won the Ian Charleson Award. She made her Broadway theatre debut in 2003 in Noël Coward's Private Lives. She has also appeared in numerous radio plays for the BBC, including playing Esme in Tom Stoppard's Rock 'n' Roll, a role she also played in the West End. More recently, she appeared in the BBC TV mini-series Cranford.

In 2009, she appeared as Daisy alongside Timothy West in the BBC Radio 4 adaptation of John Mortimer's Rumpole and the Penge Bungalow Murders. She has also appeared in the crime drama Death in Paradise playing the part of Astrid Knight. (Season 1, Episode 4). In 2014, she appeared in another crime drama DCI Banks (Series 3, Episodes 17 & 18).

In 2018, Fielding appeared in EastEnders as Ted Murray's (Christopher Timothy) daughter.

In November 2018, she provided the voice for the alien Kisar in the Doctor Who episode "Demons of the Punjab".

Awards and nominations
Fielding was nominated for a 1999 Laurence Olivier Award for Best Supporting Performance for her role in The School for Scandal in the 1998 season.
She was nominated for a 2002 Laurence Olivier Theatre Award for Best Actress in a Supporting Role of 2001 for her performance in Private Lives at the Albery Theatre, London. She won a Theatre World Award for outstanding Broadway debut for the same role when the show was produced on Broadway in 2002.
She was awarded the 1993 Critics' Circle Theatre Award for Most Promising Newcomer for her performances in Arcadia and The School for Wives.

Filmography

Audiobooks
His Dark Materials as Mrs Coulter
Vanity Fair as Rebecca Sharp Crawley
The Haunting of Hill House as The Narrator. (By Shirley Jackson. Audiobook, BBC).
Israbel as Israbel. (By Tanith Lee. Dramatisation, [A Short History of Vampires Episode 3 of 4], BBC).
Funny Girl as The Narrator. (By Nick Hornby, 2014, Penguin Audio).

She has narrated the following 
for Naxos Audiobooks:
Hamlet
Hedda Gabler
Jane Eyre
Lady Windermere's Fan
Othello
Rebecca
The Turn of the Screw
Fanny Hill

for Random House Audio:
I Don't Know How She Does It

References

External links

1970 births
Alumni of the Royal Conservatoire of Scotland
Audiobook narrators
Critics' Circle Theatre Award winners
English film actresses
English radio actresses
English stage actresses
English television actresses
Living people
People from Catterick, North Yorkshire
Royal Shakespeare Company members
English Shakespearean actresses
Ian Charleson Award winners
Theatre World Award winners
Actresses from Yorkshire
20th-century English actresses
21st-century English actresses